Huang Xuchu (1892 – November 18, 1975), a native of Rong County, Guangxi, was a politician during the Republic of China and one of the leaders of the New Guangxi clique. Among the leaders of the clique, he was ranked fourth alongside Li Zongren, Bai Chongxi and Huang Shaohong. Huang was the only one of the four giants of the clique who did not ultimately join the KMT and the Communist Party.

Biography 
Huang Xuchu was born in a scholarly family. Huang Xuchu graduated from the Republic of China Military University in the fourth term. Huang would later be promoted by Li Zongren and others. During his life, he served as the chairman of the Guangxi Provincial Government from 1942 until its collapse in 1949. For twenty years, he also concurrently served as a member of the Central Committee of the Kuomintang. On July 19, 1947, the National Government appointed Huang Xuchu as the chairman of the Guangxi Electoral Office; the National Government also appointed him as a representative of the National Assembly and a legislator of the Legislative Yuan.

On February 5, 1949, Huang Shaohong and Huang Xuchu went to Nanjing to visit Li Zongren. Regarding the peace talks, Li said that it would be better to divide the river and govern; Bai Chongxi also envisioned the same; Huang Shaohong believed that under the current disparity between the strong and the weak, divide and conquer is impossible; on February 8, Li Zongren ordered Huang Xuchu to deliver a letter from Li Zongren to Guangzhou to visit Sun Ke, Wu Tiecheng and others. On May 25, Li Zongren's Acting President ordered Huang Xuchu to be appointed as the Deputy Director of the Guilin Appeasement Office. On December 4, Acting President Li Tsung-jen appointed Huang as the Deputy Chief of the Central China Military and Political Office. At the end of the year, entrusted by Li Zongren, he transferred to Hong Kong via Haikou, where he was ordered to secretly contact both the anti-Chiang and anti-Communist forces from Tsim Sha Tsui. Wei Zhitang, former Director of the Finance Department of the Guangxi Provincial Government, transported the Guangxi Provincial Treasury to Hong Kong which he would ultimately take as his own. The resulting disillusionment Huang to move to Yokohama in 1951.

Old age 
Huang Xuchu returned to Hong Kong in 1958 due to the dispersal of his family wealth, and was arranged to live in the Shek Kip Mei Resettlement Department. During this time he would sell semi-monthly magazines to make ends meet. At some point he was hired by the government as a national policy consultant. Huang passed away on November 18, 1975 in Kowloon Baptist Hospital.

References 

1892 births
1975 deaths
Chinese anti-communists
Chinese military personnel of World War II
Members of the 1st Legislative Yuan
Members of the Kuomintang
People from Yulin, Guangxi